"Bailá Bailá" is a song by Swedish singer Alvaro Estrella. It was performed in Melodifestivalen 2021 and made it to the 13 March final finishing 10th overall in 12 finalist entries.

Charts

References

2021 songs
2021 singles
English-language Swedish songs
Melodifestivalen songs of 2021
Songs written by Jimmy Thörnfeldt
Songs written by Linnea Deb
Songs written by Wrethov